Terry Rogers is an American politician. He is a Republican representing District 10 in the Georgia House of Representatives.

Political career 

Rogers was first elected to represent District 10 in the Georgia House of Representatives in a special election in 2011. He won four re-elections unopposed, and announced that he would not seek re-election in 2020.

Rogers currently sits on the following committees:
 Appropriations (Vice-Chairman of Public Safety Subcommittee)
 Defense & Veterans Affairs
 Economic Development & Tourism (Vice-Chairman)
 Human Relations & Aging
 Regulated Industries
 Rules
 State Planning & Community Affairs (Vice-Chairman)

Electoral record

References 

Living people
Republican Party members of the Georgia House of Representatives
Year of birth missing (living people)
21st-century American politicians